The Waste Incineration Directive, more formally Directive 2000/76/EC of the European Parliament and of the Council
of 4 December 2000 on the incineration of waste (OJ L332, P91 – 111), was a Directive issued by the European Union and relates to standards and methodologies required by Europe for the practice and technology of incineration. The aim of this Directive is to minimise the impact of negative environmental effects on the environment and human health resulting from emissions to air, soil, surface and ground water from the incineration and co-incineration of waste. The requirements of the Directive were developed to reflect the ability of modern incineration plants to achieve high standards of emission control more effectively. The Directive was replaced by the Industrial Emissions Directive with effect from 7 January 2014

See also
List of solid waste treatment technologies

References

External links
Text of the directive and Summary of the directive

European Union directives
Waste legislation in the European Union
Waste legislation in the United Kingdom
Incineration
2000 in law
2000 in the European Union
2000 in the environment